Eureka is an unincorporated community in Cinque Hommes Township in Perry County, Missouri, United States. Eureka lies approximately eight miles east of Perryville, and about one mile east of Longtown. Eureka was named after the nearby school.

References 

Unincorporated communities in Perry County, Missouri
Unincorporated communities in Missouri